Philippe-Auguste de Palézieux (1871, in Mies – 25 November 1957, in Geneva) was a Swiss botanist.

In 1891 he started classes in mechanical engineering at the Eidgenössische Polytechnikum Zürich, afterwards studying botany at the University of Munich as a pupil of Ludwig Radikofer. From 1900 to 1939 he was a privatgelehrter (private scholar) in Germany, and spent much of his time in Berlin-Dahlem. In 1939 he relocated to Geneva, where in 1943 he succeeded Constantin Andreas von Regel as curator of the "Herbarium Boissier".

From 1946 to 1949 he was president of the Société Botanique de Genève.

Publications 
 Anatomisch-systematische Untersuchung des Blattes der Melastomaceen mit Ausschluss der Triben der Microlicieen, Tibouchineen, Miconieen, 1899 (dissertation) – Anatomical-systematic study on the leaves of Melastomaceae, excluding the tribes of Microlicieae, Tibouchineae and Miconieae.
 Société Botanique de Genève. Compte-rendu des séances. Séance du 19 Novembre 1923. Un hybride nouveau du genre Scabiosa. Bull. Soc. Bot. Genève, 1923 – A new hybrid of the genus Scabiosa.
 Epervières nouvelles des Alpes et du Jura (with Karl Hermann Zahn); Bull. Soc. Bot. Genève, 1924 – New hawkweed from the Jura Mountains.
 Les plantes adventices des environs de Genève de l'herbier Paiche; Bull. Soc. Bot. Genève, 1944 – Weeds from the environs of Geneva in the Paiche herbarium.

References 

1871 births
1957 deaths
Ludwig Maximilian University of Munich alumni
People from Nyon District
19th-century Swiss botanists
20th-century Swiss botanists